Viewpoints is a technique of dance composition that acts as a medium for thinking about and acting upon movement, gesture and creative space. Originally developed in the 1970s by master theater artist and educator Mary Overlie, the Six Viewpoints has been studied and practiced for decades in theatre and dance.  Overlie's practice and theory profoundly enables access to the source of inspiration and creativity. The Six Viewpoints, if practiced in the purest form, is found to be indescribably powerful and effective in all areas of investigation of, and for making art. In the simplest form, it is a practice for improvisation.

The Six Viewpoints theory was adapted by directors Anne Bogart and Tina Landau over the course of 10 years, ultimately resulting in the delineation of nine "physical" Viewpoints and 5 "vocal" ones. Bogart and Overlie were on the faculty of ETW at NYU in the late 1970s and early 1980s, during which time Bogart was influenced by Overlie's innovations.  Overlie's Six Viewpoints (space, story, time, emotion, movement, and shape) are considered to be a logical way to examine, analyze and create art in a profound way while Bogart's Viewpoints are considered practical in creating staging with actors.

Overlie's Viewpoints
SSTEMS is a mnemonic device for the six elements of Overlie's viewpoints (the actual acronym is spelled SSTEMS: Space, Shape, Time, Emotion, Movement, and Story,)  and also signifies which elements Mary Overlie considered the most important.  Note the change from the classical and modern periods in performance art, where story always took precedence over the other elements.  Viewpoints is part of the post-modern tradition, in that there is no hierarchy in the different elements that make "theatre."

Space
Architecture - The physical environment, the space, and whatever belongs to it or constitutes it, including permanent and non-permanent features.
Spatial Relationship - Distance between objects on stage; one body in relation to another, to a group, or to the architecture.
Topography - The movement over landscape, floor pattern, design and colours.

Shape
Shape - The contour or outline of bodies in space; the shape of the body by itself, in relation to other bodies, or in relation to architecture; think of lines, curves, angles, arches all stationary or in motion.
Gesture - a) Behavioral gesture: realistic gesture belonging to the physical world as we observe it every day. b) Expressive gesture: abstract or symbolic gesture expressing an inner state or emotion; it is not intended as a public  or "realistic" gesture.

Time
Tempo - How quickly or slowly something happens on stage.
Duration - How long an event occurs over time; how long a person or a group maintains a particular movement, tempo, gesture, etc. before it changes.
Kinesthetic Response - A spontaneous reaction to a motion that occurs outside of oneself. An instinctive response to an external stimulus. (realistic/non-realistic)
Repetition - a) Internal: repeating a movement done with one's own body, and b) External: repeating a movement occurring outside one's body.

Emotion
Psychological or narrative content ascribed to movement.

Movement
Movement of your body, different ways of moving - for example, jerky versus smooth/flowing versus very slowly or fast.  The movement of different parts of your body.

Story
Perceptual ability to see and understand logic systems as an arrangement of collected information

All of the different elements influence each other and work together, and can "cause" a change in a different element.  For example, the shape of your body may carry a certain emotion with it as well - something in the space of your environment may make a story out of what you are doing - etc.

The actors must focus first on the isolation of each separate viewpoint element on its own, before integrating and working them all together.  It is often that a performer finds one of the elements comes naturally, and perhaps uses that one element they really understand to access the other elements, which they must work to become more familiar with.

Bogart's and Landau's Viewpoints
In their book, The Viewpoints Book:  A  Practical Guide to Viewpoints and Composition,  Anne Bogart and Tina Landau identify the primary Viewpoints as  those relating to Time - which are Tempo, Duration, Kinesthetic Response, and Repetition - and those relating to Space - which are Shape, Gesture, Architecture, Spatial Relationship and Topography.   In addition, Bogart and Landau have added the Vocal Viewpoints which include Pitch, Volume, and Timbre. In the book, the authors outline the basics of the Viewpoints training they both espouse as well as specific methods for applying the Viewpoints to both rehearsals and production.  For Bogart and Landau, the Viewpoints represent not only a physical technique but also a philosophical, spiritual, and aesthetic approach to many aspects of their work.  Bogart references her work with the SITI company, and Landau with the Steppenwolf Theater Company.

Bogart recognizes that these are not the only Viewpoints, just the ones she finds most useful for the actors with whom she works.

Works cited

Further reading
 Bogart, Anne. 2001. A Director Prepares: Seven Essays on Art and Theatre. London: Routledge. .
 Bogart, Anne. 2007. And Then, You Act: Making Art in an Unpredictable World. London: Routledge. .
 Bartow, Arthur, 2006, "The Training of the American Actor." New York, Theatre Communications Group 
 Dixon, Michael Bigelow and Joel A. Smith, eds. 1995. Anne Bogart:Viewpoints. Career Development Ser. Lyme, NH: Smith and Kraus. .

Improvisational theatre
Acting techniques